Firmiana simplex, commonly known as the Chinese parasol tree, Chinese parasoltree, or wutong, is an ornamental plant of tree size assigned to the family Malvaceae that was formerly in the family Sterculiaceae in the order Malvales, and is native to Asia.

Description
It has alternate, deciduous leaves up to 30 cm (12 inches) across and small fragrant, greenish-white flowers borne in large inflorescences. A flowering tree varies in fragrance with weather and time of the day, having a lemony odor with citronella and chocolate tones. A tall, stately specimen grows in the botanical garden in Florence, Italy. Bumble bees and Giant Mason Bees readily visit the flowers in Maryland, U.S. People grow this tree as an ornamental in warm regions of North America.

Uses
Due to its sonic properties, the wood is used for the soundboards of several Chinese instruments, including the guqin and guzheng.

According to an article in the journal Nature of 1884, the leaves of Sterculia platanifolia were dried for smoking; the reason for smoking it was not given, but another source simply says that it was used as a substitute for tobacco.

The roasted seeds have reportedly been used to make into a tea.

Invasive species
This species is an aggressive, invasive weed in the warmer parts of North America  Some people promote its removal and give instructions for drastic measures, including destruction of nursery stock. This plant is self-fertile, and its seeds spread readily, especially along watercourses, growing rapidly after germination in favorable sites. Offspring effectively compete with many other species.

References

External links

Firmiana simplex - The University of Alabama in Huntsville
Firmiana simplex - Louisiana State University
 Firmiana simplex - PlantList Retrieved 20210102

Sterculioideae
Trees of China
Trees of Japan
Flora of the Ryukyu Islands
Trees of Taiwan
Trees of Vietnam
Garden plants of Asia
Ornamental trees